Rosh HaAyin springs, also called the Yarkon springs are springs located at the foot of Tel Afek, in the Yarkon National Park which was established in the region that surrounds the springs. These springs are one of the water resources of the Yarkon River. Until the 20th century, the water of the Rosh HaAyin springs flew into the Yarkon River, but nowadays most of the water of the Rosh HaAyin springs is used in various irrigation projects and do not reach the Yarkon River.

Utilization of the springs' water 
In 1930s the British authorities in Palestine searched for an additional major water resource for the evolving city of Jerusalem. Two options were examined at the time: the Jordan River the Yarkon River. The Jordan River is closer to Jerusalem but located at a much lower altitude than the Yarkon River and in order to bring the water up to the peaks of Jerusalem a relatively complex technology would be needed to be used, therefore the British authorities decided to opt for the alternative Yarkon-Jerusalem water extraction pipeline. Using water pumps placed in the springs which flowed into the Yarkon River, water was flowing up to Sha'ar HaGai and then through additional pumps into the city of Jerusalem. The Rosh HaAyin springs were, during the period of the British Mandate in Palestine, the main and most important water resource of Jerusalem. They provided 13,000 cubic meters of water every day to the city residents.

At the beginning of the 1950s Israeli Prime Minister David Ben-Gurion encouraged the Jewish settlement of the Negev region. As a result, he ordered the establishment of the Yarkon-Negev water pipeline. Three motors of old American destroyers from the Second World War were converted into water pumps and were used to extract the water of the Yarkon River. Those pumps were buried under an armored hill in region of kibbutz Givat HaShlosha. The reason for the armoring of the water pumps was that the border with Jordan was located only 3 kilometers from the Yarkon springs and there was concern that the Jordanian Legion might shell the water pumps, thus putting a halt to the water supply of the Negev. The Yarkon-Negev pipeline was inaugurated in 1955 and in 1964 it was combined with the national water carrier system.

During the 1960s the Yarkon-Negev pipeline drew about 90 percent of the water from the Yarkon River towards the residents of Tel Aviv and the residents of southern Israel. As a result, the flow of the river deteriorated down to 500 cubic meters an hour and at times the flow of the river completely stopped and the river channel began to clog and become a sanitary nuisance.

See also 
 Yarkon National Park

Springs of Israel